Chrzypsko Wielkie  is a village in Międzychód County, Greater Poland Voivodeship, in west-central Poland. It is the seat of the gmina (administrative district) called Gmina Chrzypsko Wielkie.

The village has a population of 920.

References

Villages in Międzychód County